Gaberje is a village in the hills south of the Vipava Valley in the Municipality of Ajdovščina in the Littoral region of Slovenia. It was first mentioned in written documents dating to 1367.

Name
The name of the settlement was changed from Gabrje to Gaberje in 1987.

Church
The parish church in the settlement is dedicated to Saint Martin and belongs to the Koper Diocese. Its door casing bears the date 1670, which is the date of extension and renovation of a much older church on the site.

References

External links 
Gaberje at Geopedia

Populated places in the Municipality of Ajdovščina